The positive and negative predictive values (PPV and NPV respectively) are the proportions of positive and negative results in statistics and diagnostic tests that are true positive and true negative results, respectively.  The PPV and NPV describe the performance of a diagnostic test or other statistical measure. A high result can be interpreted as indicating the accuracy of such a statistic. The PPV and NPV are not intrinsic to the test (as true positive rate and true negative rate are); they depend also on the prevalence. Both PPV and NPV can be derived using Bayes' theorem.

Although sometimes used synonymously, a positive predictive value generally refers to what is established by control groups, while a post-test probability refers to a probability for an individual. Still, if the individual's pre-test probability of the target condition is the same as the prevalence in the control group used to establish the positive predictive value, the two are numerically equal.

In information retrieval, the PPV statistic is often called the precision.

Definition

Positive predictive value (PPV) 
The positive predictive value (PPV), or precision, is defined as 

where a "true positive" is the event that the test makes a positive prediction, and the subject has a positive result under the gold standard, and a "false positive" is the event that the test makes a positive prediction, and the subject has a negative result under the gold standard. The ideal value of the PPV, with a perfect test, is 1 (100%), and the worst possible value would be zero.  

The PPV can also be computed from sensitivity, specificity, and the prevalence of the condition:

 

cf. Bayes' theorem

The complement of the PPV is the false discovery rate (FDR):

Negative predictive value (NPV) 
The negative predictive value is defined as:

where a "true negative" is the event that the test makes a negative prediction, and the subject has a negative result under the gold standard, and a "false negative" is the event that the test makes a negative prediction, and the subject has a positive result under the gold standard. With a perfect test, one which returns no false negatives, the value of the NPV is 1 (100%), and with a test which returns no true negatives the NPV value is zero.  

The NPV can also be computed from sensitivity, specificity, and prevalence:

Although sometimes used synonymously, a negative predictive value generally refers to what is established by control groups, while a negative post-test probability rather refers to a probability for an individual. Still, if the individual's pre-test probability of the target condition is the same as the prevalence in the control group used to establish the negative predictive value, then the two are numerically equal.

Relationship
The following diagram illustrates how the positive predictive value, negative predictive value, sensitivity, and specificity are related.

Note that the positive and negative predictive values can only be estimated using data from a cross-sectional study or other population-based study in which valid prevalence estimates may be obtained. In contrast, the sensitivity and specificity can be estimated from case-control studies.

Worked example
Suppose the fecal occult blood (FOB) screen test is used in 2030 people to look for bowel cancer:

The small positive predictive value (PPV = 10%) indicates that many of the positive results from this testing procedure are false positives. Thus it will be necessary to follow up any positive result with a more reliable test to obtain a more accurate assessment as to whether cancer is present. Nevertheless, such a test may be useful if it is inexpensive and convenient. The strength of the FOB screen test is instead in its negative predictive value — which, if negative for an individual, gives us a high confidence that its negative result is true.

Problems

Other individual factors
Note that the PPV is not intrinsic to the test—it depends also on the prevalence. Due to the large effect of prevalence upon predictive values, a standardized approach has been proposed, where the PPV is normalized to a prevalence of 50%. PPV is directly proportional to the prevalence of the disease or condition. In the above example, if the group of people tested had included a higher proportion of people with bowel cancer, then the PPV would probably come out higher and the NPV lower. If everybody in the group had bowel cancer, the PPV would be 100% and the NPV 0%.

To overcome this problem, NPV and PPV should only be used if the ratio of the number of patients in the disease group and the number of patients in the healthy control group used to establish the NPV and PPV is equivalent to the prevalence of the diseases in the studied population, or, in case two disease groups are compared, if the ratio of the number of patients in disease group 1 and the number of patients in disease group 2 is equivalent to the ratio of the prevalences of the two diseases studied. Otherwise, positive and negative likelihood ratios are more accurate than NPV and PPV, because likelihood ratios do not depend on prevalence.

When an individual being tested has a different pre-test probability of having a condition than the control groups used to establish the PPV and NPV, the PPV and NPV are generally distinguished from the positive and negative post-test probabilities, with the PPV and NPV referring to the ones established by the control groups, and the post-test probabilities referring to the ones for the tested individual (as estimated, for example, by likelihood ratios). Preferably, in such cases, a large group of equivalent individuals should be studied, in order to establish separate positive and negative predictive values for use of the test in such individuals.

Bayesian updating
Bayes' Theorem confers inherent limitations on the accuracy of screening tests as a function of disease prevalence or pre-test probability. It has been shown that a testing system can tolerate significant drops in prevalence, up to a certain well-defined point known as the prevalence threshold, below which the reliability of a positive screening test drops precipitously. That said, Balayla et al. showed that sequential testing overcomes the aforementioned Bayesian limitations and thus improves the reliability of screening tests. For a desired positive predictive value  that approaches some constant , the number of positive test iterations  needed is:

where 
  is the desired PPV
  is the number of testing iterations necessary to achieve  
  is the sensitivity
  is the specificity
  is disease prevalence, and
  is a constant.
Of note, the denominator of the above equation is the natural logarithm of the positive likelihood ratio (LR+).

Different target conditions
PPV is used to indicate the probability that in case of a positive test, that the patient really has the specified disease. However, there may be more than one cause for a disease and any single potential cause may not always result in the overt disease seen in a patient. There is potential to mix up related target conditions of PPV and NPV, such as interpreting the PPV or NPV of a test as having a disease, when that PPV or NPV value actually refers only to a predisposition of having that disease.

An example is the microbiological throat swab used in patients with a sore throat. Usually publications stating PPV of a throat swab are reporting on the probability that this bacterium is present in the throat, rather than that the patient is ill from the bacteria found. If presence of this bacterium always resulted in a sore throat, then the PPV would be very useful. However the bacteria may colonise individuals in a harmless way and never result in infection or disease. Sore throats occurring in these individuals are caused by other agents such as a virus. In this situation the gold standard used in the evaluation study represents only the presence of bacteria (that might be harmless) but not a causal bacterial sore throat illness. It can be proven that this problem will affect positive predictive value far more than negative predictive value. To evaluate diagnostic tests where the gold standard looks only at potential causes of disease, one may use an extension of the predictive value termed the Etiologic Predictive Value.

See also
 Binary classification
 Sensitivity and specificity
 False discovery rate
 Relevance (information retrieval)
 Receiver-operator characteristic
 Diagnostic odds ratio
 Sensitivity index

References 

Biostatistics
Statistical ratios
Categorical data
Summary statistics for contingency tables